Pool B of the First Round of the 2017 World Baseball Classic was held at Tokyo Dome, Tokyo, Japan from March 7 to 10, 2017, between Australia, China, Cuba and Japan. Pool B was a round-robin tournament. Each team played the other three teams once, with the top two teams advancing to Pool E.

Two-time champions Japan concluded Pool B with a 3–0 record, whereas China lost all three games after their poor performances and must now qualify for the 2021 World Baseball Classic. Cuba defeated Australia to advance to the second round.

Standings

Pool B MVP:  Yoshitomo Tsutsugoh

Results
All times are Japan Standard Time (UTC+09:00).

Japan 11, Cuba 6

Cuba 6, China 0

Japan 4, Australia 1

Australia 11, China 0

Cuba 4, Australia 3

Japan 7, China 1

References

External links
Official website

Pool B
World Baseball Classic Pool B
International baseball competitions hosted by Japan
World Baseball Classic Pool B
Sports competitions in Tokyo